The first round of the 2017 Croatian local elections was held on 21 May and the second round, where necessary, on 4 June. All seats of the county prefects, city and municipal mayors and members of county, municipal and city councils were up for election.

In total, there were 9,576 open seats contested by 47,601 candidates. Voters were electing: 20 county prefects, 128 city mayors, 428 municipal mayors, 51 deputy county prefects, 195 deputy city mayors, 440 deputy municipal mayors, 63 deputy city and municipal mayors elected by the national minorities, 836 county councilors, 2,226 city councilors and 5,152 municipal councilors. 3,719,182 voters had the right to vote, which was 39,500 fewer than at the previous local elections. There were around 73,000 members of the polling and electoral commissions and more than 12,000 observers. State Election Commission distributed around 14,000,000 ballots. In the second round, held on 4 June, there were runoffs in eight counties, City of Zagreb, 54 towns and 102 municipalities. 2,791,000 voters had a right to vote. There were 4,443 polling stations. A third election round was held in Stari Grad on 18 June 2017 since both candidates got the same number of votes in the second round.

Election results

Counties

Cities

See also
2017 Zagreb local elections
2017 Split local elections
2017 Rijeka local elections

References

2017 elections in Croatia
2017
May 2017 events in Europe
June 2017 events in Europe